Anals may refer to:

 Anal scales of a reptile
 Anāl people, an ethnic group of India

See also 
 Anal (disambiguation)
 Annals